This was the first edition of the tournament.

Josh Goodall and Joseph Sirianni won the title after defeating Mikhail Elgin and Alexander Kudryavtsev 6–3, 6–1 in the final.

Seeds

Draw

References
 Main Draw

Doubles
SAT Bangkok Open - Doubles
 in Thai tennis